Third Time Lucky may refer to:
 Third Time Lucky (1931 film), a British comedy
 Third Time Lucky (1949 film), a British drama
"Third Time Lucky" (1963 record) DECCA F11730 - by The Beat Boys (produced by Joe Meek)
 Third Time Lucky (TV series), a 1982 ITV Yorkshire television sitcom starring Derek Nimmo and Nerys Hughes
 Third Time Lucky, a 1986 short story by Tanya Huff
"Third Time Lucky", a song on 1979 album Boogie Motel by Foghat
"Third Time Lucky", a song on 1994 album The Sweetest Illusion by Basia

See also
House of Angels – Third Time Lucky, a 2010 Swedish film
Princess Diaries: Third Time Lucky, a 2001 book by Meg Cabot